The Hamilton Hotel, formerly known as the Hamilton Crowne Plaza, is an AAA 4-diamond luxury hotel in downtown Washington, D.C., United States, located at 1001 14th Street, N.W., just to the north of Franklin Square. In September 2017, the hotel became independent from the Crowne Plaza hotel chain.

Hamilton Hotel is a member of Historic Hotels of America, the official program of the National Trust for Historic Preservation.

History

Designed by local architect Jules Henri de Sibour, construction of the Beaux-Arts style Hamilton Hotel was completed in 1922.  The building was listed on the National Register of Historic Places on April 17, 2013.

In 1996, French hotel developer Albert Cohen bought the Hamilton and an adjacent office building. The office building was converted into additional rooms and meeting space for the Hamilton Hotel. Cohen sold the hotel building to the Massachusetts Mutual Life Insurance Company in 1997.

In September 2017, Massachusetts Mutual Life sold the hotel building to a new owner, EOS DCH Owner LLC, for $106.5 million. The hotel disassociated from the Crowne Plaza brand, and became an independent property.

In June 2019, Hamilton Hotel completed a mult-million dollar renovation project with a new lobby design, a new restaurant, Via Sophia, and a new cocktail bar, Society.

Location
The 320-room Hamilton Hotel is located in downtown Washington, D.C., and features a 1920s art deco look. It is an AAA 4-diamond luxury hotel. The hotel is located five blocks away from the White House and one block from the McPherson Square WMATA metro station. It is within walking distance of the Smithsonian Institution museum, the National Mall and the Corcoran Gallery of Art.

Features
In June, 2019 Hamilton Hotel debuted two new food & beverage concepts. Via Sophia, offering wood-fired Neapolitan pizza and other Italian fare is located in the lobby of Hamilton Hotel. Society, a new speakeasy-style cocktail bar is also located within the hotel. 

In the hotel there are 17 suites, 207 single rooms, 111 double rooms, 318 non-smoking rooms and 17 accessible rooms. There also are executive floors and rooms. In total there are 14 floors.

See also
 National Register of Historic Places listings in central Washington, D.C.
 Architecture of Washington, D.C.

References

External links

 Hamilton Hotel official site

Beaux-Arts architecture in Washington, D.C.
Hotel buildings completed in 1922
Hotel buildings on the National Register of Historic Places in Washington, D.C.
Manger hotels